The Cornell–Dartmouth football rivalry is an American college football rivalry between the Cornell Big Red and Dartmouth Big Green. The two schools were both major football powers before the split between the NCAA Division I Football Bowl Subdivision (FBS) and Football Championship Subdivision (FCS). Prior to the split, Cornell captured national championships in 1915, 1921, 1922, 1923, and 1939. Dartmouth won its lone national championship in 1925. One of the most infamous games in the rivalry contained national title implications. The 1940 game, referred to as the Fifth Down Game, ended Cornell's school-record 16 game unbeaten streak, as it sought a second consecutive national championship. After emerging with a 7–3, the Big Red voluntarily forfeited to Dartmouth when review of film showed the Cornell had inadvertently used five downs. The ESPN College Football Encyclopedia named the game, and Cornell's honorable concession, the second greatest moment in college football history. 

The rivalry series is the second-longest uninterrupted series in the Football Championship Subdivision with 101 consecutive meetings since 1919, as of the most recent 2019 contest. This record trails only the series between Lehigh and Lafayette, which has met 130 consecutive times as of 2019. Since the advent of the Ivy League in 1954, Dartmouth and Cornell have continued their annual series, which has featured several long winning streaks from the Big Green. The most recent, a ten game streak from 2009 to 2018, was snapped by a 20–17 Cornell victory that denied Dartmouth a chance at an outright league title.  Ranked #12, Dartmouth was the highest ranked opponent that Cornell had defeated since a 23–14 victory over Ohio State during the Big Red's 1939 national championship season.  In aggregate, Dartmouth has won a league-record 19 Ivy championships, while Cornell has claimed three championships in league competition.

Game results

See also 
 List of NCAA college football rivalry games
 List of most-played college football series in NCAA Division I
 Fifth Down Game (1940)

References

College football rivalries in the United States
Cornell Big Red football
Dartmouth Big Green football